Xperedon is an initiative started in 2010, intended to revolutionise the way people make charitable donations. The company's website allows users to add a percentage of their monthly expenditure which is then donated to charity.  The website allows customers to then disperse that amount to as many charities as desired, and is the first major initiative to match what a person spends to their level of charitable donation. As of June 2011, Xperedon has over 5250 different charities in 25 countries available to support listed on its website, however, new charities can be proposed by anyone. Xperedon does not charge charities for being listed on its website.

Personal Charity Plan
The Xperedon system is based on its users building their own Personal Charity Plan.  This plan allows customers to specify details about the way in which they donate, including; the amount they give, which charities they give to, and the way in which those donations are distributed. Once the user has chosen how much to give in total, and the list of charities they wish to give to (their Charity Portfolio), they can opt either to distribute their total donation between those evenly, or weight their donations in favour of one or more particular charities. Customers control who they give to, the amount they give, and how the amount is spread. Xperedon then takes care of all of the administration and settlement with the charities.  Customers can choose to prioritise their donations, offering a higher percentage to a particular charity, and can alter this amount at any time, for example increasing aid to African charities in a particularly bad year of famine.  Xperedon calls the amount a particular customer decides to give their "uplift". Xperedon users can opt to be known to the charities they donate to or to remain completely anonymous.

CardLink
'CardLink' is a technology by Xperedon that allows customers using a Personal Charity Plan to link their credit or debit card spending to their charity plan.  The system allows customers to match the nature of charitable donations with the nature of a customer's spending, rather than giving a set amount per month. Customers can also choose to link the way they spend to the way in which they give.  For example the Charity Plan can be set up to specify that the donation "uplift" on card expenditure on petrol automatically leads to that attributed donation being directed to an environmental charity.  Likewise, if a customer spends £100 in a restaurant, a £1 donation could automatically be made to a charity that prevents famine.

References

British fundraising websites
Financial services companies of Switzerland